Sretensk is a town and the administrative center of Sretensky District in Zabaykalsky Krai, Russia, located on the right bank of the Shilka River (Amur basin),  east of Chita, the administrative center of the krai. Population:

History
It was founded in 1689 and granted town status in 1926. Between October 1914 and 1921, it accommodated the Sretensk prisoner of war camp.

Administrative and municipal status
Within the framework of administrative divisions, Sretensk serves as the administrative center of Sretensky District, to which it is directly subordinated. As a municipal division, the town of Sretensk, together with one rural locality (the selo of Morgul), is incorporated within Sretensky Municipal District as Sretenskoye Urban Settlement.

Transportation
The P426 road leads west to Nerchinsk. The P429 road leads west to Shelopugino, Gazimursky Zavod, Nerchinsky Zavod, and eventually to the border with China.

Climate
Sretensk has a cold humid continental climate (Köppen climate classification Dwb) bordering closely on a subarctic climate (Köppen climate classification Dwc), with severely cold winters and very warm summers. Precipitation is quite low but is much higher in summer than at other times of the year.

References

Notes

Sources

Cities and towns in Zabaykalsky Krai
Populated places established in 1689
17th-century establishments in Russia
1689 establishments in Russia
Transbaikal Oblast